Daisy Igel (1926/1927 – 2019) was a Brazilian architect and billionaire heiress. She studied Architecture at the School of Design - IIT Illinois Institute of Technology, in Chicago, Il and had Johannes Itten, Joseph Albers and Konrad Wacksmann as teachers.  She was a professor at the School of Industrial Design of the State University of Rio de Janeiro, from 1969 to 1970.She also gave courses at the Museum of Modern Art in Rio de Janeiro.

Daisy Igel is the daughter of Ernesto Igel, the founder of Ultrapar.

Igel was divorced, with three children, and lived in Rio de Janeiro.

Daisy Igel died in 2019.

References

1920s births
2019 deaths
Year of birth uncertain
Brazilian architects
Brazilian women architects
Brazilian billionaires
Female billionaires
Igel family
People from Rio de Janeiro (city)